Following is a list of AIGA medalists who have been awarded the American Institute of Graphic Arts medal.

On its website, AIGA says "The medal of the AIGA, the most distinguished in the field, is awarded to individuals in recognition of their exceptional achievements, services or other contributions to the field of graphic design and visual communication."

AIGA Medals have been awarded since 1920. Nine medals were awarded in the 1920s, seven in the 1930s, eight in the 1940s, twelve in the 1950s, ten in the 1960s, 13 in the 1970s, 13 in the 1980s, 33 in the 1990s, and 45 in the 2000s.

2020s

2022 

 Andrew Satake Blauvelt
 Emily Oberman
 Louise Sandhaus

2021 

 Archie Boston, Jr.
Cheryl D. Miller 
Terry Irwin

2010s

2019 

 Alexander Girard
 Geoff McFetridge 
 Debbie Millman

2018 
 Aaron Douglas
 Arem Duplessis
 Karin Fong
 Susan Kare
 Victor Moscoso

2017 
 Art Chantry 
 Emmett McBain 
 Rebeca Méndez 
 Mark Randall 
 Nancy Skolos and Tom Wedell 
 Lance Wyman

2016 
 Ruth Ansel 
 Richard Grefé 
 Maira Kalman 
 Gere Kavanaugh 
 Corita Kent

2015
Paola Antonelli 
Hillman Curtis 
Emory Douglas 
Dan Friedman 
Marcia Lausen

2014
Sean Adams and Noreen Morioka 
Charles S. Anderson 
Dana Arnett 
Kenneth Carbone and Leslie Smolan 
David Carson 
Kyle Cooper 
Michael Patrick Cronan 
Richard Danne 
Michael Donovan and Nancye Green 
Stephen Doyle 
Louise Fili 
Bob Greenberg 
Sylvia Harris 
Cheryl Heller 
Alexander Isley 
Chip Kidd 
Michael Mabry 
J. Abbott Miller 
Bill Moggridge 
Gael Towey 
Ann Willoughby

2013
 John Bielenberg  
 William Drenttel 
 Tobias Frere-Jones 
 Jessica Helfand 
 Jonathan Hoefler 
 Stefan Sagmeister 
 Lucille Tenazas 
 Wolfgang Weingart

2011
 Ralph Caplan 
 Elaine Lustig Cohen 
 Armin Hofmann 
 Robert Vogele

2010
 Steve Frykholm 
 John Maeda 
 Jennifer Morla

2000s

2009
 Pablo Ferro 
 Carin Goldberg 
 Doyald Young

2008
 Gail Anderson 
 Clement Mok 
 LeRoy Winbush

2007
 Edward Fella 
 Ellen Lupton 
 Bruce Mau 
 Georg Olden

2006
 Michael Bierut 
Rick Valicenti 
 Lorraine Wild

2005
 Bart Crosby 
 Meredith Davis 
 Steff Geissbuhler

2004
 Joseph Binder 
 Charles Coiner 
 Richard, Jean and Patrick Coyne 
 James Cross 
 Sheila Levrant de Bretteville 
 Jay Doblin 
 Joe Duffy 
 Martin Fox 
 Caroline Warner Hightower 
 Kit Hinrichs 
 Walter Landor 
 Philip Meggs 
 James Miho 
 Silas Rhodes 
 Jack Stauffacher 
 Alex Steinweiss 
 Deborah Sussman 
 Edward Tufte 
 Fred Woodward 
 Richard Saul Wurman

2003
 B. Martin Pedersen 
 Woody Pirtle

2002
 Robert Brownjohn 
 Chris Pullman

2001
 Samuel Antupit 
 Paula Scher

2000
 P. Scott Makela and Laurie Haycock Makela 
 Fred Seibert 
 Michael Vanderbyl

1990s

1999
 Tibor Kalman 
 Steven Heller 
 Katherine McCoy

1998
 Louis Danziger 
 April Greiman

1997
 Lucian Bernhard 
 Zuzana Licko and Rudy VanderLans

1996
 Cipe Pineles 
 George Lois

1995
 Matthew Carter 
 Stan Richards 
 Ladislav Sutnar

1994
 Muriel Cooper 
 John Massey

1993
 Alvin Lustig 
 Tomoko Miho

1992
 Rudolph de Harak 
 George Nelson 
 Lester Beall

1991
 Colin Forbes 
 E. McKnight Kauffer

1990
 Alvin Eisenman 
 Frank Zachary

1980s
 Paul Davis, 1989 
 Bea Feitler, 1989 
 William Golden, 1988 
 George Tscherny, 1988 
 Alexey Brodovitch, 1987 
 Gene Federico, 1987 
 Walter Herdeg, 1986 
 Seymour Chwast, 1985 
 Leo Lionni, 1984 
 Herbert Matter, 1983 
 Massimo Vignelli and Lella Vignelli, 1982 
 Saul Bass, 1981 
 Herb Lubalin, 1980

1970s
 Ivan Chermayeff and Thomas Geismar, 1979 
 Lou Dorfsman, 1978 
 Charles and Ray Eames, 1977 
 Henry Wolf, 1976 
 Jerome Snyder, 1976 
 Bradbury Thompson, 1975 
 Robert Rauschenberg, 1974
 Richard Avedon, 1973 
 Allen Hurlburt, 1973 
 Philip Johnson, 1973 
 Milton Glaser, 1972 
 Will Burtin, 1971 
 Herbert Bayer, 1970

1960s
 Dr. Robert L. Leslie, 1969 
 Dr. Giovanni Mardersteig, 1968 
 Romana Javitz, 1967 
 Paul Rand, 1966 
 Leonard Baskin, 1965
 Josef Albers, 1964 
 Saul Steinberg, 1963 
 William Sandberg, 1962 
 Paul A. Bennett, 1961 
 Walter Paepcke, 1960

1950s
 May Massee, 1959 
 Ben Shahn, 1958 
 Dr. M. F. Agha, 1957 
 Ray Nash, 1956 
 P. J. Conkwright, 1955 
 Will Bradley, 1954
 Jan Tschichold, 1954 
 George Macy, 1953 
 Joseph Blumenthal, 1952 
 Harry L. Gage, 1951 
 Earnest Elmo Calkins, 1950 
 Alfred A. Knopf, 1950

1940s
 Lawrence C. Wroth, 1948 
 Elmer Adler, 1947 
 Stanley Morison, 1946 
 Frederic G. Melcher, 1945
 Edward Epstean, 1944 
 Edwin and Robert Grabhorn, 1942 
Carl Purington Rollins, 1941
 Thomas M. Cleland, 1940

1930s
 William A. Kittredge, 1939 
 Rudolph Ruzicka, 1935 
J. Thompson Willing, 1935
 Henry Lewis Bullen, 1934
 Porter Garnett, 1932 
 Dard Hunter, 1931 
 Henry Watson Kent, 1930

1920s
 William A. Dwiggins, 1929 
 Timothy Cole, 1927 
 Frederic W. Goudy, 1927 
 Burton Emmett, 1926 
 Bruce Rogers, 1925
 John G. Agar, 1924 
 Stephen H. Horgan, 1924 
 Daniel Berkeley Updike, 1922 
 Norman T. A. Munder, 1920

See also
 Art Directors Club Hall of Fame
 Masters Series (School of Visual Arts)

References

Design awards
 
AIGA